The governor of Milan ruled the Duchy of Milan as a representative of the Holy Roman Emperor (1535–1556), the King of Spain (1556–1706) and the Archduke of Austria (1706–1796) and (1799–1800). The first governor was appointed after the death of the last duke of the House of Sforza, Francesco II.

Charles V
Antonio de Leyva, Prince of Ascoli 1535–1536, died in office
Cardinal Marino Caracciolo 1536–1538, civil, died in office
Alfonso d'Avalos d'Aquino, Marquis of Vasto 1538–1546, military
Ferdinando Gonzaga, Prince of Molfetta, Duke of Ariano 1546–1555
Fernando Álvarez de Toledo, 3rd Duke of Alba 1555–1556

Spanish rule
Cristoforo Madruzzo 1556–1557
Gonzalo II Fernández de Córdoba (1520-1578) 1558–1560, first term
Francesco Ferdinando II d'Ávalos 5th Marquis of Pescara 1560–1563
Gonzalo II Fernández de Córdoba (1520-1578) 1563–1564, second term
Gabriel de la Cueva, 5th Duke of Alburquerque 1564–1571, died in office
Álvaro de Sande 1571–1572
Luis de Zúñiga y Requesens 1572–1573
Antonio de Zúñiga y Sotomaior, 3rd Marquis of Ayamonte 1573–1580, died in office
Sancho de Guevara y Padilla 1580–1583
Carlo d'Aragona Tagliavia 1583–1592
Juan Fernández de Velasco, 5th Duke of Frías 1592–1595, first term
Don Pedro de Padilla 1595–1595
Juan Fernández de Velasco, 5th Duke of Frías 1595–1600, second term
Pedro Enríquez de Acevedo, Count of Fuentes 1600–1610, died in office
Juan Fernández de Velasco, 5th Duke of Frías 1610–1612, third term
Juan de Mendoza, Marquis de la Hinojosa 1612–1616
Pedro Álvarez de Toledo, 5th Marquis of Villafranca 1616–1618
Gómez Suárez de Figueroa, 3rd Duke of Feria 1618–1625, first term
Gonzalo Fernandez de Córdoba 1625–1629
Ambrogio Spinola, 1st Marquis of the Balbases 1629–1630, died in office
Álvaro de Bazán, 2nd Marquis of Santa Cruz 1630–1631
Gómez Suárez de Figueroa, 3rd Duke of Feria 1631–1633, second term
Ferdinand, the Cardinal–Infant 1633–1634
Cardinal Gil de Albornoz 1634–1635
Diego Felipez de Guzmán, Marquis of Leganés 1635–1636, first term
Fernando Afán de Ribera, duke of Alcalá de los Gazules 1636, died in office
Diego Felipez de Guzmán, Marquis of Leganés 1636–1641, second term
Juan de Velasco, Count of Siruela 1641–1643
Antonio Sancho Davila, Marquis of Velada 1643–1646
Bernardino Fernández de Velasco, 6th Duke of Frías 1646–1648
Luis de Benavides Carrillo, Marquis of Caracena 1648–1656
Cardinal Teodoro Trivulzio 1656–1656
Alfonso Pérez de Vivero, Count of Fuensaldaña 1656–1660
Francesco Caetani, 8th Duke of Sermoneta 1660–1662
Luis de Guzmán Ponce de Leon 1662–1668, died in office
Paolo Spinola, 3rd Marquis of the Balbases 1668–1668, first term
Francisco de Orozco, Marquis of Olias 1668–1668
Paolo Spinola, 3rd Marquis of the Balbases 1669–1670, second term
Gaspar Téllez-Girón, 5th Duke de Osuna 1670–1674
Claude Lamoral, Prince of Ligne 1674–1678
Juan Henríquez de Cabrera, Count of Melgar 1678–1686
Antonio López de Ayala Velasco y Cardeñas, Count of Fuensalida 1686–1691
Diego Dávila Mesía y Guzmán, 3rd Marquis of Leganés 1691–1698
Prince Charles Henry de Lorraine-Vaudemont 1698–1706

Milan fell to the Austrian army on September 26, 1706 during the War of the Spanish Succession. The Austrian rule was confirmed by the Treaty of Rastatt.

Austrian rule
Prince Eugene of Savoy 1706–1716
Maximilian Karl Albert, Prince of Löwenstein-Wertheim-Rochefort 1717–1718, died in office
Count Girolamo Colloredo 1719–1725
Count Wirich Philipp von Daun 1725–1734
Sardinian occupation 1734–1736
Otto Ferdinand von Abensberg und Traun 1736–1743
Prince Georg Christian von Lobkowitz 1743–1745
Spanish occupation 1745–1746
Gian Luca Pallavicini 1745–1747
Ferdinand Bonaventura II von Harrach 1747–1750
Gian Luca Pallavicini 1750–1754
Francis III, Duke of Modena 1754–1771, administrator of Austrian Lombardy
Archduke Peter Leopold of Austria 1754–1763, titular, became Grand Duke of Tuscany
Archduke Ferdinand of Austria 1763–1771, titular
Archduke Ferdinand of Austria 1771–1796
Transpadane Republic 1796–1797
Cisalpine Republic 1797–1799
Count Luigi Cocastelli 1799–1800

The Austrians abandoned Milan after the Battle of Marengo and the duchy was incorporated again in the Cisalpine Republic, which became the Italian Republic in 1802 and the Kingdom of Italy in 1805. In 1814 the Austrians retook Milan and, joined to the former Republic of Venice, it was formed into a new kingdom, the Kingdom of Lombardy–Venetia, ruled by Austrian-appointed viceroys.

Notes

Sources  
 GOBERNACIÓN DEL MILANESADO 
 Storia de Milano (it)

Milan
History of Milan
Milan Governors
Governors
 List